Edina is a female given name. Notable people with the name include:

Given names

Athletes
Edina Dobi (born 1987), Hungarian volleyball player
Edina Füsti (born 1982), Hungarian race walker
Edina Gallovits-Hall (born 1984), Romanian tennis player
Edina Gangl (born 1990), Hungarian water polo goalkeeper
Edina Knapek (born 1977), Hungarian fencer
Edina Kocan (born 2002), Luxembourger footballer
Edina Kotsis (born 1990), Hungarian taekwondoist
Edina Müller (born 1983), German wheelchair basketball player

Arts and literature
Edina Altara (1898–1983), Italian illustrator, decorator and fashion designer
Edina Balogh (born 1984), Hungarian actress, model, and beauty queen
Edina Kulcsár (born 1990), Hungarian actress, model, and beauty queen
Edina Ronay (born 1943), Hungarian fashion designer and former actress.
Edina Szvoren (born 1974), Hungarian writer

Other
Edina Alves Batista (born 1980), Brazilian football referee
Edina Leković, Montenegrin American academic
Edina Tóth, Hungarian politician

Fictional characters
Edina Monsoon, fictional character

See also

 Adina (given name)
 Adena (name)
 Idina

Feminine given names